Silvano Poropat (born April 19, 1971) is a Croatian professional basketball coach. Poropat started his coaching career in 2000, and since then he has coached in Germany, Latvia and the Netherlands.

Coaching career
On January 1, 2010, Poropat was signed by Latvian side BK Ventspils as their new head coach. On May 5, 2011, Poropat was fired after failing to reach the LKL finals.

From 2011 until 2015, Poropat was the head coach of German side Mitteldeutscher BC. In the 2011–12 season, Poropat won the second division ProA with Mitteldeutscher and promoted to the Basketball Bundesliga. He was named the BBL Coach of the Year of the 2013–14 season.

On March 3, 2016, Telekom Baskets Bonn signed Poropat as their new head coach.

On May 31, 2017, Poropat signed a two-year contract with New Heroes Den Bosch of the Dutch Basketball League. On March 12, 2018, Poropat was suspended for four games in the DBL, after insulting referees during a game. Den Bosch finished fourth in the standings and was eliminated in the quarter-finals by fifth seed Rotterdam. On the first day of the start of his second season with Den Bosch, Poropat and New Heroes parted ways.

In January 2019, Poropat returned to Mitteldeutscher BC.

References

1971 births
Living people
BG Karlsruhe coaches
BK Ventspils coaches
Croatian basketball coaches
Croatian expatriate basketball people in Germany
Croatian expatriate basketball people in the Netherlands
Heroes Den Bosch coaches
MHP Riesen Ludwigsburg coaches
Mitteldeutscher BC coaches
People from Pula
Telekom Baskets Bonn coaches
Yugoslav expatriate basketball people in Germany